Couture may refer to:

People
 Couture (surname)

Places

Belgium
 Couture-Saint-Germain, a village in the municipality of Lasne, Belgium

Canada
 Couture crater and Lac Couture, an impact crater and the lake that covers it in Quebec, Canada

France
 Couture, Charente, in the Charente département, France
 Couture-d'Argenson, in the Deux-Sèvres département, France
 Couture-sur-Loir, in the Loir-et-Cher département, France
 La Couture (disambiguation), locations in France

United States
The Couture, proposed high-rise in Milwaukee, Wisconsin

Fashion
 Haute couture, sometimes just called couture

See also
 Couturier
 Culture (disambiguation)